One Night On Fire is a DVD and live album by the English progressive rock band Tinyfish. It was recorded during the band's performance at the Wyspianski Theatre, Katowice, Poland on 16 February 2009.

DVD Track listing 

 "Honey Nut Loops"
 "Motorville"
 "The Big Red Spark"
 "Build Your Own Enemy"
 "Pagodas"
 "Wide Awake At Midnight"
 "Eat The Ashes"
 "The Sarcasm Never Stops"
 "Ride"
 "Driving All Night"
 "Too High For Low Company"
 "Cinnamon"
 "Fly Like A Bird"
 "Nine Months On Fire"
 "All Hands Lost (part 1)"
 "Tinyfish"
 "All Hands Lost (part 2)"

CD Track listing 

 "Honey Nut Loops"
 "Motorville"
 "The Big Red Spark"
 "Build Your Own Enemy"
 "Pagodas"
 "Wide Awake At Midnight"
 "The Sarcasm Never Stops"
 "Ride"
 "Driving All Night"
 "Too High For Low Company"
 "Cinnamon"
 "Fly Like A Bird"
 "Nine Months On Fire"
 "All Hands Lost (part 1)"
 "Tinyfish"
 "All Hands Lost (part 2)"

Personnel
 Simon Godfrey – Lead vocals, guitars, guitar synthesizer
 Jim Sanders - Guitars, backing vocals
 Paul Worwood - Bass guitar
 Robert Ramsay - Spoken word
 Leon Camfield - Drums, percussion, samples, backing vocals

References

Tinyfish albums
2009 live albums
2009 video albums
Live video albums